Bulbophyllum wadsworthii, commonly known as the yellow rope orchid, is a species of epiphytic or lithophytic orchid that forms clumps that hang off the surface on which the plant is growing. The pseudobulbs are small and partly hidden by brown, papery bracts. Each pseudobulb has a single fleshy, dark green leaf and a single star-shaped, cream-coloured or pale green flower with an orange labellum. It mainly grows on trees and rocks in rainforest and is endemic to Queensland.

Description
Bulbophyllum wadsworthii is an epiphytic or lithophytic herb that forms clumps hanging from the substrate. The flowers are cream-coloured to pale green and are arranged in groups of up to three. Flowering occurs from September to November.

Taxonomy and naming
Bulbophyllum wadsworthii was first formally described in 1964 by Alick Dockrill who published the description in The Orchadian from a specimen collected by "K. Wadsworth" near Ravenshoe. The specific epithet (wadsworthii) honours the collector of the type specimen.

Distribution and habitat
The yellow rope orchid usually grows on trees and rocks in rainforest but sometimes on treefern trunks and on trees remaining in cleared paddocks. It is found between the Cedar Bay National Park and the Paluma Range National Park.

References

wadsworthii
Orchids of Queensland
Endemic orchids of Australia
Plants described in 1964